This is a collection of scientific, public nationwide opinion polls that have been conducted relating to the 2008 Democratic presidential candidates.

2008

After Jan.

Jan. 2008

2007

Before 2007

Three-way contest

Head-to-head polling

Acceptability

State primary polls

See also
Democratic Party (United States)
2008 United States presidential election
Nationwide opinion polling for the United States presidential election, 2008

Notes

References

External links
 RealClearPolitics – Democratic Presidential Nomination
 Pollster.com 2008 National Democratic Presidential Primary

2008 United States Democratic presidential primaries
Democratic